John Caine, author and playwright

John Caine may also refer to:

John Thomas Caine, British-born American politician
John Caine (athletic director), see Leo Harris
John Caine (basketball), see Rex Darling

See also
John Cain (disambiguation)
John Kane (disambiguation)
John Du Cane